Dawid Bohdan Jackiewicz (born 18 March 1973 in Wrocław) is a Polish politician, and the former Minister of State Treasury (2015–2016).

In 1998, he graduated with a degree in political science from the University of Wrocław.

He was elected to the Sejm, the Polish legislature, on 25 September 2005, receiving 12,362 votes in 3 Wrocław district, as a candidate on the Law and Justice party list. He was re-elected in 2007 and 2011.

In 2007, Jackiewicz held office as the Secretary of State in the Ministry of the Treasury. He was a member of the European Parliament for the Lower Silesia Province and Opolian Silesia region for the Law and Justice Party. He was elected in 2014.

He was Vice-Chair of the Delegation to the EU-Moldova Parliamentary Association Committee, a member of the Committee on Industry, Research and Energy (ITRE) and on the Committee on the Internal Market and Consumer Protection (IMCO).

Dawid and Anna Jackiewicz have two sons.

See also
Members of Polish Sejm 2005–2007
Members of Polish Sejm 2007–2011

External links
Dawid Jackiewicz – parliamentary page – includes declarations of interest, voting record, and transcripts of speeches.
Personal page in English

11

1973 births
Living people
Politicians from Wrocław
Members of the Polish Sejm 2005–2007
Law and Justice politicians
Movement for Reconstruction of Poland politicians
MEPs for Poland 2014–2019
Government ministers of Poland
Members of the Polish Sejm 2007–2011